Frans Johan ”Janne” Myyryläinen (30 December 1881, Viipuri—8 May 1938, Petrozavodsk) was a Finnish Red Guard during the Finnish civil war. He was also a Red Guardian in Kainuu and an officer Guardian in Soviet Russia.

Myyryläinen worked as forest guardian and as a shopkeeper in Kainuu and as an inspector in the early 20th century. He became member in the Kainuu red guards. The opposition White Guard said that Myyryläinen was a dangerous man.

During the civil war in 1918 Myyryläinen was arrested and tried. His punishment was two years in prison and he lost his civic confidence for 12 years but escaped and was recaptured.

On his way to the Hennala camp in Lahti Myyryläinen was able to escape a second time and this time to Soviet Union. In Russia, he was in a red guard officer school. Later, he organized  an underground movement in Kainuu.

Myyryläinen is known as the leader of the Pork mutiny in 1922 in Salla and in Savukoski. Using the name Jahvetti Moilanen, he stood on a crate that had formerly contained pork and delivered a speech that called the 'Declaration of Battle of the Red Guerrilla Battalion of the North'. After the speech, some 300 workers joined the battalion and were armed and given money. The Battalion then returned to the border. On its way, it robbed a group of border guards and other workplaces. On February 7, the battalion, by that time numbering 240, crossed back to the Soviet Union. Information on the incident was received at Rovaniemi only on February 5 and the battalion slipped away before a group of the White Guard arrived. In the Soviet Union, Myyryläinen continued as a Red Army teacher in the Russian part of Karelia. Later, he worked as journalist in Petrozavodsk using the name Juuso Matero.

During the Great Purges, Myyryläinen was arrested on May 5 and was executed on May 8, 1938, perhaps in Petrozavodsk.

During the Khrushchev thaw, a military tribune overturned the verdict against Myyryläinen on 21 May 1957.

Myyryläinen was married two twice and had three children from his second marriage.

The location of his grave is unknown.

1881 births
1938 deaths
Military personnel from Vyborg
People from Viipuri Province (Grand Duchy of Finland)
Finnish communists
People of the Finnish Civil War (Red side)
Finnish emigrants to the Soviet Union
Soviet rehabilitations
Great Purge victims from Finland
Finnish escapees
Escapees from Finnish detention
20th-century Finnish journalists